Angels in the Outfield is a 1994 American family sports fantasy comedy-drama film directed by William Dear. It is a remake of the 1951 film of the same name. It stars Danny Glover, Tony Danza and Christopher Lloyd, and features several future stars, including Joseph Gordon-Levitt (in the lead), Adrien Brody, Matthew McConaughey, and Neal McDonough. It was followed by two made for TV sequels, Angels in the Endzone and Angels in the Infield. It was released less than a month before the 1994 MLB Baseball Strike, which forced the league to cancel the playoffs and the World Series.

Plot 
Young foster child Roger Bomman and his friend, J.P., love to sneak into baseball games of the struggling California Angels. Still in limited contact with his widowed father, Roger asks when they will be a family again. His father replies sarcastically, "I'd say when the Angels win the pennant". Taking his father's words literally, he prays for God to help the Angels win. In a game against the Toronto Blue Jays which Roger and J.P. attend, he sees a group of angels led by Al helping the team. Although he can see them quite clearly, everyone else can only explain the seemingly impossible acts as freak occurrences. Roger's unique ability to see which players are receiving help from angels leads their skeptical manager George Knox to keep him around as a good luck charm and consultant. Due to the much-needed help, the Angels start to win games and make a surprising second-half surge to the top of their division.

Roger's father permanently gives up custody of him, believing it is in Roger's best interest. As Roger laments his loss, an equally distraught J.P. accidentally reveals to antagonistic sportscaster Ranch Wilder that Roger has the ability to see angels, and that George has been winning through the advice Roger gave him. Hoping to permanently end George's career in baseball since their days as players, Wilder informs the press of this, and their owner Hank Murphy threatens to relieve George of his management responsibilities. Roger comes clean to his caretaker Maggie Nelson about his special ability, and at a press conference, they and the entire team defend George in front of the press. Moved by their faith, Murphy allows him to remain as the Angels' manager.

During the final game of the season against the rival Chicago White Sox, none of the angels show up to help the team. Later on, Al appears to Roger and explains that championships must be decided without the angels' intervention. He also says that he is there to check on pitcher Mel Clark, who only has months to live due to his years of smoking and will become an angel himself. Mel struggles in the ninth inning but perseveres after encouragement from George, his team, and the fans in attendance. The Angels ultimately win the game on their own and clinch the division title and the pennant, while Murphy fires Wilder for insulting the team on the air. George adopts Roger and J.P., as he wants to try to be a father. J.P. sees Al and says, "I knew it could happen". Al flies off and says, "We're always watching".

Cast 
 Danny Glover as George Knox (Angels Manager)
 Joseph Gordon-Levitt as Roger Bomman
 Brenda Fricker as Maggie Nelson (Foster Mom)
 Tony Danza as Mel Clark (Angels Pitcher)
 Christopher Lloyd as Al "The Boss" Angel
 Ben Johnson as Hank Murphy (Angels Owner)
 Jay O. Sanders as Ranch Wilder (Angels Sportscaster)
 Milton Davis Jr. as J.P.
 Taylor Negron as David Montagne (Angels team assistant)
 Tony Longo as Triscuitt Messmer (Angels Catcher)
 Neal McDonough as Whitt Bass (Angels Pitcher)
 Stoney Jackson as Ray Mitchell (Angels Third Baseman)
 Adrien Brody as Danny Hemmerling (Angels Utility Player)
 Tim Conlon as Wally (Angels Color Commentator)
 Matthew McConaughey as Ben Williams (Angels Outfielder)
 Israel Juarbe as Jose Martinez (Angels Second Baseman)
 Albert Garcia as Pablo Garcia (Angels Shortstop)
 Dermot Mulroney as Mr. Bomman (Roger's Father)
 Robert Clohessy as Frank Gates (Angels Pitcher)
 Danny Walcoff as Marvin
 O.B. Babbs as Mapel (Angels Player)
 Mitchell Page as Abascal (Angels First Baseman)
 Carney Lansford as Kit "Hit or Die" Kesey
 Bill Dear as Blue Jays Manager
 Mark Cole as Norton (Angel Outfielder)
 Jeff Seaberg as Popcorn Vendor
 Jonathan Proby as Miguel Scott

Production
In July 1993, Caravan Pictures reached an agreement with director William Dear to helm screenwriter Holly Goldberg Sloan's remake of MGM’s 1951 baseball picture Angels in the Outfield. Unlike the original, which focused on the Pittsburgh Pirates as the team in heavenly need, the film focuses on the California Angels, who did not exist when the original was released in 1951; in addition to the name coincidence, The Walt Disney Company, which distributed the film, was a minority owner of the Angels at the time. The film did, however, premiere at the Pirates' home stadium at the time, Three Rivers Stadium in Pittsburgh. The premiere would be the only reference to the Pirates, due to both teams playing in separate leagues (Angels in the American League, Pirates in the National League) and the film being released three years before the start of interleague play. Both teams would finally meet head-to-head for the first time in 2002 in Anaheim, the season in which the real-life Angels would win the AL pennant and eventually the 2002 World Series, the first and only time they would do either.

Reception
The film has a rating of 32% on Rotten Tomatoes based on 28 reviews, with an average rating of 4.4/10. The site's consensus reads: "A queasy mishmash of poignant drama and slapstick fantasy, Angels in the Outfield strikes out as worthy family entertainment". Audiences polled by CinemaScore gave the film an average grade of "A" on an A+ to F scale.

Box office
The film opened at #4 at the North American box office, making $8,916,463 USD in its opening weekend. It went on to gross $50.2 million at the box office domestically.

Year-end lists
 Top 10 worst (not ranked) – Dan Webster, The Spokesman-Review

See also

 List of films about angels

References

External links 

 
 
 
 
 
 

1994 films
1990s sports comedy-drama films
1990s fantasy comedy-drama films
1990s sports films
American baseball films
American sports comedy-drama films
Films about angels
California Angels
Caravan Pictures films
Walt Disney Pictures films
1990s English-language films
Films directed by William Dear
Remakes of American films
American fantasy comedy-drama films
Children's comedy-drama films
Films set in Los Angeles
Films set in Orange County, California
Religion and sports
Films produced by Joe Roth
Films produced by Roger Birnbaum
Films scored by Randy Edelman
1990s children's comedy films
1994 comedy films
1990s American films
Films about Major League Baseball